The Minett Park Fond-de-Gras is an open-air museum including Fond-de-Gras, the village of Lasauvage, the former open-pit mine "Giele Botter" and the Celtic oppidum of Titelberg. Thanks to its wide thematic variety, the Minett Park offers many complementary activities, the red wire of which is iron ore.

It is located in the south of Luxembourg.

A little history
The iron ore located in the south of Luxembourg is part of the largest European deposit, with an area of nearly 110,000 hectares. However, only 3,700 hectares were in the territory of Luxembourg. Most of the deposit was located in France (Lorraine).

Historically, the Fond-de-Gras was one of the most important mining centres in Luxembourg. A few years after the closure of the last mine at the Fond-de-Gras in 1964, a few volunteers worked to preserve part of the railway line with the aim of operating a tourist train on the line. The first train ran in 1973.

Fond-de-Gras 
Today, at the Fond-de-Gras, several historic buildings have been preserved: an electric power station, old grocery store, rolling mill train, railway station and railway sheds, testifying to the mining activity that took place there for nearly a century. Two historic trains still circulate :

Train 1900 
The Train 1900 runs between Pétange and Fond-de-Gras, on the former "Mining Line". The train line was opened in 1874 in order to transport the iron ore extracted from neighbouring mines. A truly unique experience in Luxembourg and the Greater Region - step back in time with the Train 1900 .

Minièresbunn
Back when the mines were operational, mining trains were vital for removing the iron ore carriages from the mine. At present, the Minièresbunn runs between Fond-de-Gras and Lasauvage and offers a sensational experience when visiting the bottom of the mine.

Lasauvage
One of the oldest iron and steel facilities in Luxembourg was located in Lasauvage: a forge built around 1625. The village experienced spectacular growth owing to the Count of Saintignon. This French industrialist at the time owned mines in Lasauvage and built many buildings in the village: houses for the workers, a church, village hall, etc. Many of these buildings are still standing today and bestow the village with exceptional charm.

3 galleries and museums are in Lasauvage :

- The miner's old changing room, the Salle des Pendus

- The museum Eugène Pesch showcases a collection of fossils, minerals and old mining tools

- The Espace Muséologique de Lasauvage is dedicated to the village's history and to a group of young people, who had to hide in a mine, in order to avoid the Wehrmacht's uniform during World War II.

Nature and archaeology
The Minett Park Fond-de-Gras extends between green valleys, plateaus bathed in sunlight and vast forests, making it the ideal destination for breathtaking walks. This lays to rest the notion that the south of Luxembourg was ruined by its industrial past. A large-scale open-cast mine, the Giele Botter has been transformed into a hundred hectare nature reserve that is being reclaimed by the flora and fauna. At the time of the Celts, the site of Titelberg played a major role due to an important oppidum erected in the first century BC. The excavations carried out at Titelberg testify that it was the capital of the Treviri tribe.

Draisines - Rail-Bike
6 draisines (4 seat rail bikes) are circulating on the track linking the Fond-de-Gras with the Bois-de-Rodange.

See also

 List of museums in Luxembourg

External links
 Minett Park Fond-de-Gras

Museums in Luxembourg
Buildings and structures in Pétange
Rail transport preservation in Luxembourg